Shukkeien-mae is a Hiroden station on the Hiroden Hakushima Line, located in Kamihatchobori, Naka-ku, Hiroshima. The station serves the nearby Shukkei-en, and is operated by the Hiroshima Electric Railway.

Routes
There is one route that serves Shukkeien-mae Station:
 Hakushima - Hatchobori Route

Station layout
The station consists of two staggered side platforms serving two tracks. Crosswalks connect the platforms with the sidewalk. There is a small shelter located on the middle of each platform.

Adjacent stations

Surrounding area
Shukkei-en
Hiroshima Prefectural Art Museum
Hiroshima High Court
Noborimachi Junior High School

History
Opened on November 23, 1912.

See also

Hiroden Streetcar Lines and Routes

References

Shukkeien-mae Station
Railway stations in Japan opened in 1912